The Falleron is a French coastal river forming the boundary between the departments of Vendée and Loire-Atlantique and flowing into the Bay of Biscay and Atlantic Ocean via the Bay of Bourgneuf.

Geography

Hydrography
To the west of Falleron town  joins on the left bank.

The gradient of the Tenu is so slight that fresh water can be diverted from the Loire at high tide this far upstream. A pumping station at La Pommeraie, built in 1962, raises water the remaining  from the Tenu to the Falleron. The canal increasingly serves to drain Machecoul during periods of intense rainfall.

Downstream of Machecoul the Falleron opens into the marshes and polders of the Marais Breton, and divides and connects with a complex network of freshwater and semi-tidal creeks and canals. On the right bank  and  form the core of a section to the north. The channels reunite at Port de la Roche and are re-joined by the étier de la Salle on the right bank. The Falleron flows into the Bay of Bourgneuf at the Port du Collet.

Communes crossed
The Falleron crosses or constitutes the limit of the following municipalities:

 Grand'Landes (Vendée);
 Falleron (Vendée) and Touvois (Loire-Atlantique);
 Froidfond, La Garnache (Vendée) and Saint-Étienne-de-Mer-Morte (Loire-Atlantique);
 Paulx (Loire-Atlantique);
 Machecoul (Loire-Atlantique);
 Bois-de-Céné (Vendée) and Bourgneuf-en-Retz (Loire-Atlantique);
 Bouin (Vendée) and Les Moutiers-en-Retz (Loire-Atlantique).

See also

Notes and references

Rivers of Loire-Atlantique
Rivers of Vendée
Rivers of Pays de la Loire
Rivers of France